Varsa Doshi is a Member of Legislative assembly from Wadhwan constituency in Gujarat for its 12th legislative assembly.

References

Living people
Gujarat politicians
Women in Gujarat politics
Gujarat MLAs 2007–2012
Gujarat MLAs 2012–2017
21st-century Indian women politicians
21st-century Indian politicians
Bharatiya Janata Party politicians from Gujarat
Year of birth missing (living people)